Parasailing, also known as parascending, paraskiing or parakiting, is a recreational kiting activity where a person is towed behind a vehicle while attached to a specially designed canopy wing that resembles a parachute, known as a parasail wing. The manned kite's moving anchor may be a car, truck, or boat. The harness attaches the occupant to the parasail, which is connected to the boat, or land vehicle, by the tow rope. The vehicle then drives off, carrying the parascender (or wing) and person into the air. If the boat is powerful enough, two or three people can parasail behind it at the same time. The parascender has little or no control over the parachute. The activity is primarily a fun ride, not to be confused with the sport of paragliding.

There are commercial parasailing operations all over the world. Land-based parasailing has also been transformed into a competition sport in Europe. In land-based competition parasailing, the parasail is towed to maximum height behind a 4-wheel-drive vehicle. The driver then releases the tow line; the parasailer flies down to a target area in an accuracy competition.

The sport was developed in the late 1970s, and has been very popular ever since. The first international competitions were held in the mid-1980s and continue annually to this day. Over the years, the competitions have grown in scope as well as the number of participants.

Terminology

Spinnaker vs. parasailing 
Spinnaker is a recreational activity that is commonly mistaken as parasailing. Both of them allow people to ascend on the ocean by using the wind force against a specially designed canopy. Parasailing includes ascending while spinnaker allows a person to swing at the front of the tow vehicle, i.e., boat.

Parachute vs. parasailing
Both the parachute and parasail can ascend and glide. The primary difference between the two is that the parasail is more stable and efficient during the ascent mode when being towed aloft with minimum or zero steering control by the parasailor. The parachute is not efficient when towed and is primarily used for skydiving where the parachutist can fully control the direction. In the descent mode, both are designed to slow the fall of a person during said descent at any given altitude.

History

Early years of parasailing 
There is at least one somewhat credible early-19c indication of a person being towed through the air on a kite; the instance is mentioned in passing as having been witnessed by an old sailor telling of it on the 1839-1841 cruise of the USS Constitution.

The first ascending-gliding parachute was developed by Pierre-Marcel Lemoigne in 1962. The same year, Lemoigne established an Aeronautical Training Center to introduce his new ascending-gliding parachute as a training tool for parachutists. The technique allows parachutists to train more efficiently by towing the parachutist to a suitable altitude, then releasing them to practice landings. This training method proved cheaper than—and just as effective as—an airplane. In 1963, Jacques-André Istel from Pioneer Parachute Company bought a license from Lemoigne to manufacture and sell the 24-gore ascending-gliding parachute which was trade-named "parasail."

In 1974, Mark McCulloh invented the first self-contained parasail launch and recovery vessel that incorporated a hydraulic winch and canopy assist mast that collectively launched and retrieved the parasail canopy and parasailors to and from the vessel flight deck. McCulloh's invention was patented in 1976 and later referred to as a "WINCHBOAT" which set the first parasail equipment industry standard that is utilized by all commercial parasail operations around the world. Independently of this, in 1981 Marcel and Azby Chouteau of Westport, Connecticut, designed and built a pontoon-based craft with a fan-shaped back deck and a winch in the front and ran a commercial parasailing operation using their original technology. The company, Old Mill Airlines, offered flights on Long Island Sound during the summer of 1981.

In early 1976, Brian Gaskin designed, created, and tested the first 16-gore canopy design which he named "Waterbird". The Waterbird was revolutionary in its canopy design, its unique tow yoke harness arrangement, its construction, and the use of zero porosity fabrics which allowed it to be used over water safely. The majority of commercial parasail operators then moved to the 16-gore canopy arrangement. In 1976 Gaskin founded his company, Waterbird Parakites, which is still in operation today, producing commercial and recreational 16-gore parasails.

In April 2013, the first ASTM parasail weather standard was approved. With the help of the WSIA, and the chair of the parasail committee, Matthew Dvorak, owner and operator of Daytona Beach Parasail, Inc. the new standard was implemented. This is the first standard in the parasail industry with three more in the works to be approved later this year. This standard was the first step in bringing the otherwise unregulated industry into a more uniform and safe industry.

Improved parasail canopy designs 
In recent years, operators have moved from small (20-foot range) parachutes to large (30–40 feet) parachutes with high-lift, low-drag designs, enabling operators to fly heavier payloads in lower (typically safer) winds. Most operators now offer double and triple flights using an adjustable side-by-side bar arrangement. The side-by-side bar is aluminum attached to the yoke of the chute, allowing two or three passenger harnesses to be attached side by side.

Regulation
In 2014, the  National Transportation Safety Board issued a press release in which it found the parasailing industry to be largely unregulated. The report identified a number of safety concerns which included vessel operators who continued to operate despite hazardous wind conditions, use of inadequate equipment and unserviceable gear, and compromised strength of rope tied to the parasail. In a period from 1998 to the third of July 2013, there were six parasailing fatalities in the Florida area. The great majority of deaths in parasail incidents have occurred when riders were unable to get out of their harness support system after an unplanned landing in water during high winds.

Prior to the release of the NTSB report, Florida passed the White-Miskell Act which added strict regulations parasailing companies must follow including obtaining an insurance policy, and restrictions on parasailing in inclement weather.

Parasailing associations 

The leading trade associations for parasailing are:
Commercial Winchboat Operators Association (CWOA)
Parasail Safety Council 
PAPO (Professional Association of Parasail Operators)
Water Safety Industry Association ?
EPPA (European Professional Parasailing Association)  ?

See also 
Kite line
Kite mooring
Kite types
Kitesurfing
Paragliding

References

External links

Parachuting
Water sports
Kites